Harold E. Hanson (October 31, 1895November 29, 1978) was an American lawyer from Madison, Wisconsin.  He was city attorney for 23 years (1938–1961) and served as interim mayor during 1961.  He also served 11 years as an assistant U.S. attorney.

Biography
Harold E. Hanson was born in Stoughton, Wisconsin, and attended Lawrence University, in Appleton, Wisconsin.  While attending university, however, he chose to enlist in the Wisconsin National Guard for service in World War I.  He served in a field hospital in France with the 32nd U.S. Infantry Division.

After returning from the war, he completed his education at the University of Wisconsin Law School, graduating in 1922.  Shortly after graduating he was appointed city attorney of his hometown, Stoughton.  He was then hired as an Assistant United States Attorney for the Western District of Wisconsin, serving from 1927 until 1938.

In 1938, Madison, Wisconsin, city attorney Francis Lamb resigned his office due to poor health.  The city council sought applicants to fill the position and ultimately received interest from 14 local attorneys.  After an examination, Hanson topped a list of candidates.  The city council unanimously approved Hanson's selection in April 1938.

Hanson ultimately served 23 years as city attorney.  In 1961, Madison mayor Ivan A. Nestingen was appointed Undersecretary for the United States Department of Health, Education, and Welfare, creating a vacancy in the mayor's office.  On February 3, 1961, Hanson was unanimously elected to serve as interim mayor.  He served through the April 1961 election and retired at the end of his 74 day term.

He died at Veterans hospital in Madison on November 29, 1978.

References

1895 births
1978 deaths
People from Stoughton, Wisconsin
University of Wisconsin Law School alumni
Mayors of Madison, Wisconsin
Lawyers from Madison, Wisconsin
American military personnel of World War I